Noel Hill may refer to:

Noel Hill (musician) (1958), Irish concertina-player
Noel Hill & Tony Linnane, 1978 album
Noel Hill (rugby league), Australian rugby league footballer

Barons Berwick of Attingham:
Noel Hill, 1st Baron Berwick (1745–1789)
Thomas Noel Hill, 2nd Baron Berwick (1770–1832)
William Noel-Hill, 3rd Baron Berwick (1773–1842)
Richard Noel-Hill, 4th Baron Berwick (1774–1848)
Richard Noel Noel-Hill, 5th Baron Berwick (1800–1861)
William Noel-Hill, 6th Baron Berwick (1802–1882)
Richard Henry Noel-Hill, 7th Baron Berwick (1847–1897)
Thomas Henry Noel-Hill, 8th Baron Berwick (1877–1947)
Charles Michael Wentworth Noel-Hill, 9th Baron Berwick (1897–1953)

See also
Noel Hill (Antarctica)